Jüri Ratas (born 2 July 1978) is an Estonian politician who was the 18th prime minister of Estonia from 2016 to 2021. He has been Leader of the Centre Party since 2016, and was the mayor of Tallinn from 2005 to 2007.

Jüri Ratas' first cabinet was in office from 23 November 2016 to 29 April 2019. It formed when Social Democrats and the Union of Pro Patria and Res Publica joined the opposition's no-confidence vote against the previous cabinet and switched the liberal centre-right Reform Party with the Estonian Centre Party.

Jüri Ratas' second cabinet was active from April 2019 to January 2021. It has been notable for its share of public scandals, resignations of ministers and the number of public apologies from Ratas, mostly connected to the activities of the nationalist and right-wing populist EKRE party, a coalition member. His tenure has also seen the national budget of Estonia moving to deficit after years of being in surplus. According to a national poll conducted in November 2019, Ratas was the preferred person for the seat of the prime minister in the country for 36% of voters, the highest in the poll. In January 2020 his coalition was supported by a quarter of the electorate.

Ratas resigned as prime minister on 13 January 2021 after the prosecutor general of Estonia suspected the Centre Party of "criminal involvement" in an influence peddling scandal involving businessman Hillar Teder. Ratas stated that he had no knowledge of the alleged affair and had committed no wrongdoing, but resigned to take political responsibility for the scandal. He remained as the head of a caretaker government until a new coalition was formed. On 26 January, Ratas' second cabinet was superseded by Kaja Kallas' first cabinet.

Career 

He acted as the vice-president of the Riigikogu from 2007 to 2016 and Mayor of Tallinn from 2005 to 2007, attaining the post at age 27. As a mayor of Tallinn he initiated the European Green Capital Award programme.

In the 2015 Estonian parliamentary election, Ratas was re-elected to the parliament with 7,932 individual votes. In March he was elected as the second deputy speaker of the Riigikogu.

On 5 November 2016, Ratas was elected to succeed Edgar Savisaar as the leader of the Centre Party. After Taavi Rõivas' second cabinet split in November 2016 due to internal struggle, coalition talks began between Centre Party, Social Democratic Party, and Pro Patria and Res Publica Union.

Premiership

On 19 November, the three parties agreed on the conditions of Ratas' first cabinet. Ratas was sworn in as the prime minister of Estonia on 23 November.

After 2019 parliamentary election, Ratas turned down an offer from the liberal, election-winning Reform Party for coalition and instead entered into talks with the conservative Isamaa and the often-considered as far-right, EKRE. On 17 April, Riigikogu granted Ratas the authority to form the government and remain Prime Minister. These talks resulted in the formation of Ratas' second cabinet in April 2019.

During his tenure, the national budget of Estonia went into deficit after years of being in surplus. This drew widespread criticism, notably from the European Commission and the Estonian Central Bank.

On 9 March 2018, after Poland's referral to the European Court of Justice, leaders of Latvia, Lithuania and Estonia expressed their support for Poland over the Article 7 of the Treaty on European Union. Ratas said that "Any problems related to voting and taking away the right to vote – I do not think that it should happen at all, it would be a step too far."

Coalition formation controversy of 2019
In the elections of 2019, the party of Ratas, the Estonian Centre Party, lost support while the oppositional, liberal Estonian Reform Party, gained support and became the largest party by parliament seats in Estonia. After the elections, Ratas turned down an offer by the Reform party for coalition talks and entered into talks with Isamaa and EKRE, the latter being widely considered a far-right party. Ratas had previously ruled out forming a coalition with EKRE during the election campaign because of its hostile views.

The subsequent reversal of his stance and the inclusion of EKRE by Ratas in coalition talks after the elections was met with local and international criticism. In a poll conducted after the start of the coalition talks, the party of Jüri Ratas further lost support.

The critics of the decision have claimed that Ratas is willing to sacrifice his party's values, the confidence of his voters and the stability and reputation of the country to keep his position as prime minister. Ratas has countered that his first duty is to look for ways to get his party included in the government to be able to work in the benefit of his voters and that the coalition would continue to firmly support the EU, NATO and would be sending out messages of tolerance.

Some key members and popular candidates of the party of Ratas have been critical of the decision, with Raimond Kaljulaid leaving the party in protest. Yana Toom, a member of the party and its representative in the European Parliament expressed criticism of the decision. Mihhail Kõlvart, popular among the Russian-speaking voters and the newly-elect mayor of Tallinn, has said the Centre party cannot govern with EKRE's approach.

The decision was also criticised by Guy Verhofstadt, leader of the ALDE group in the European Parliament where The Centre Party of Ratas is a member, suggesting that Ratas should break off coalition talks with the national-conservative EKRE. Ratas responded in the Estonian media that "Brussels should not dictate to us what our coalition should be like."

When on the third week of coalition talks, Martin Helme of EKRE accused gynaecologists of violating their Hippocratic Oath by performing abortions, Ratas demanded the party to stop accusing doctors – with this being the first public criticism of EKRE by Ratas after the start of the coalition talks.

On 17 April, Riigikogu voted in favour of granting Ratas the authority to form the government.

Ratas resigned as prime minister on 13 January 2021 after the Prosecutor General suspected the Centre Party of "criminal involvement" in an influence peddling scandal involving businessman Hillar Teder. Ratas stated that he had no knowledge of the alleged affair and had committed no wrongdoing, but chose to resign to take political responsibility for the scandal. He remained as the head of a caretaker government until a new coalition was formed.
On 25 January 2021 Kaja Kallas formed an Estonian Reform Party-led coalition government with the Estonian Centre Party.

Personal life
Ratas was born in Tallinn, Estonia. His father is Centre Party politician Rein Ratas. He attended secondary school in Nõmme. He graduated in Business Management from Tallinn University of Technology and obtained a master's degree in Economic Sciences from the same university. He also holds a bachelor's degree in Law from the University of Tartu.

Ratas is married; he has a daughter and three sons.

Ratas regards himself to be a believer and has completed the Alpha course at St. Olaf's Church. Although in the press he has been described as a baptist, he has denied this. Apart from the Estonian language, Ratas is fluent in English and has an understanding of Russian, Swedish and Portuguese. He began learning Russian in early 2017.

His hobbies include chess, reading and horse riding.

Honours

National honours
 : Order of the National Coat of Arms, 2nd class (23 February 2021)

Foreign honours
 : Grand Officer of the Order of the Three Stars (8 April 2019)
 : Knight Grand Cross of the Order of Orange-Nassau (12 June 2018)
 : Member 2nd Class of the Order of Prince Yaroslav the Wise (21 October 2022)

References

External links
Profile of Ratas at Tallinn.ee
Profile of Ratas at Parliament web

|-

|-

1978 births
21st-century Estonian politicians
Estonian Centre Party politicians
Estonian Christians
Living people
Mayors of Tallinn
Members of the Riigikogu, 2007–2011
Members of the Riigikogu, 2011–2015
Members of the Riigikogu, 2015–2019
Members of the Riigikogu, 2019–2023
Members of the Riigikogu, 2023–2027
Politicians from Tallinn
Prime Ministers of Estonia
Recipients of the Order of the National Coat of Arms, 2nd Class
Speakers of the Riigikogu
Tallinn University of Technology alumni